Ture Michael Ödlund (15 May 1894 – 14 December 1942) was a Swedish curler who won a silver medal at the 1924 Winter Olympics in Chamonix.

References

1894 births
1942 deaths
Swedish male curlers
Olympic curlers of Sweden
Olympic silver medalists for Sweden
Curlers at the 1924 Winter Olympics
Olympic medalists in curling
People from Sundsvall Municipality
Medalists at the 1924 Winter Olympics
Sportspeople from Västernorrland County